Badr is an Arabic origin name which is used as a masculine given name and a surname. In other regions such as in Iran it is also used as a feminine given name. People with the name include:

Given name
Badr Al-Attas (born 1997), Emirati football player
Badr Bashir (born 1997), Saudi Arabian football player
Badr Benoun (born 1993), Moroccan football player
Badr Bilal (born 1962), Qatari football player
Badr Boulahroud (born 1993), Moroccan football player
Badr bin Saud al Busaidi, Omani politician
Badr al-Din, multiple people
Badr Gaddarine (born 1997), Moroccan football player
Badr Hari (born 1984), a Moroccan-Dutch kickboxer
Badr al-Jamali (died 1094), general and de facto ruler of the Fatimid Caliphate
Badr Jafar, Emirati businessman
Badr El Kaddouri (born 1981), a Moroccan footballer
Badr Lama (1907–1947), Palestinian actor 
Badr Mirza (born 1984), Emirati racing cyclist
Badr al-Molouk (1897–1979), Queen consort in Qajar Iran
Badr al-Mu'tadidi (died 912), commander-in-chief of the Abbasid Caliphate under al-Mu'tadid
Badr Zaki Nacer (born 1988), Moroccan football player 
Badr El Ouazni (born 1991, Italian football player 
Badr Shakir al-Sayyab (1926–1964), Iraqi poet
Badr bin Abdullah Al Saud (born 1985), Saudi Arabian businessman and politician
Badr bin Abdulaziz Al Saud (1932–2013), Saudi royal
Badr bin Muhammad Al Saud, Saudi royal
Badr bin Saud Al Saud (1934–2004), Saudi royal
Badr bin Sultan Al Saud (born 1980), Saudi royal
Badr Siwane (born 1994), Moroccan triathlete

Middle name
 Adnan Badr Hassan, Syrian security officer
 Arabi Badr Mokhtar (born 2001), Egyptian football player
 Mohamed Badr Hassan (born 1989), Egyptian-born football player
 Sayyid Badr Albusaidi (born 1960), Omani diplomat and politician

Surname
Ageel bin Muhammad al-Badr (born 1973), Yemeni royal
Ahmad bin Ibrahim Badr (1920–2009), Saudi Arabian artist 
Bashir Badr (born 1935), Indian Urdu poet
Ibrahim Badr, Lebanese musician
Jamaluddin Badr, Afghan politician
Kamal Badr (born 1954), Lebanese academic
Liana Badr (born 1950), Palestinian writer
Mai Badr (born 1968), Syrian origin British journalist
Mohamed Badr (born 1929), Egyptian wrestler
Mohammed Al Badr (born 1997), Qatari football player
Muhammad al-Badr (1926−1996), the last king of the Mutawakkilite Kingdom of Yemen
Nusrat Badr (died 2020), Indian lyricist
Samir Badr (born 1992), American soccer player 
Sara Badr (born 1987), Egyptian squash player
Sawsan Badr (born 1959), Egyptian actress
Shafiq Badr (died 2013), Lebanese politician
Wael Badr (born 1978), Egyptian basketball player
Zaki Badr, (1926–1997), Egyptian politician

Fictional characters
Badroulbadour (more properly Badr ul-budūr), a fairy tale character who Aladdin married

Arabic masculine given names
Arabic-language surnames
Persian feminine given names